The Farizon Xingxiang V (远程 星享V) is an electric 5-door microvan designed and produced by the Chinese automaker Geely under the Farizon brand from March 2022. It was sold under the Xingxiang （星享） product series which focuses on vehicles for urban logistics.

Overview

The Farizon Xingxiang V is a fully electric urban logistics microvan by Farizon Auto, specially designed for the needs of urban logistics and distribution. Two variants are available, with the Xingxiang V5E being in the microvan segment and the longer Xingxiang V6E being in the light commercial vehicles segment.

In February 2022, Farizon Auto signed a strategic partnership agreement with Korea’s Farizon Auto Myoung Shin Co. Ltd., with the Farizon Xingxiang V being the first product under the partnership and would be produced and sold in Korea.

Specifications
The Xingxiang V is powered by a 60kW permanent magnet synchronous electric motor positioned over the rear axle, with the output of which reaching 82 hp, and 220 Nm of torque. A 41.86 kWh lithium iron phosphate flat battery pack supplied by CATL is located right under the floor. The top speed is 90km/h.

The Xingxiang V is built on the GMA architecture with OTA compatibility and features a 1600mm-wide cargo area with the volume of the cargo compartment reaching 6 cubic meters. A full charge gives the van 260km of range and a fast charger could charge the vehicle from 20% to 80% in under 50 minutes.

References

External links
Official website

Farizon Xingxiang V
Vans
Electric vans
Cars introduced in 2022
2020s cars
Rear-wheel-drive vehicles